Various political parties and organisations hold elected representation in the thirty-two London borough councils. This list includes the parties of the 1,851 borough councillors, but excludes the City of London Corporation as its elections are nominally fought in a nonpartisan system.  The number of councillors elected at the 2018 London local elections is shown.

Political parties 
 London Labour Party (1,128)
 London Conservatives (508)
 London Liberal Democrats (152)
 London Green Party (11)

Changes since 2018 elections
The People's Alliance of Tower Hamlets was subsequently disbanded on August 29, 2018, with their only elected councillor joining the Liberal Democrats.

Residents, independent, and single issue group  
 Havering Residents Association, Havering (17)
 Merton Park Ward Independent Residents (3)
 Various independents (12)

References

London
London
Parties
Parties